Setohyllisia setosa is a species of beetle in the family Cerambycidae, and the only species in the genus Setohyllisia. It was described by Stephan von Breuning in 1949.

References

Agapanthiini
Beetles described in 1949
Monotypic beetle genera